The Fist of the North Star manga by Buronson and Tetsuo Hara  was adapted into two animated television series produced by Toei Animation.  The original series, simply titled , lasted 109 episodes, which aired on Fuji TV from October 11, 1984 to March 5, 1987, adapting the first 136 chapters of the original manga. A sequel series, Hokuto no Ken 2, took over the previous series' time slot and lasted 43 episodes, airing from March 12, 1987 to February 18, 1988, which adapts chapters 137 to 210 (the final chapters of the manga were not adapted).

Fist of the North Star

Part 1

Part 2

Part 3

Part 4

Fist of the North Star 2

Part 5

Part 6

References

External links
 Shin Kyuseishu Densetsu - Hokuto no Ken official website 
 Toei Animation's official Seikimatsu Kyūseishu Densetsu: Hokuto no Ken website 
 

Episodes
Fist of the North Star

ja:北斗の拳 (テレビアニメ)